Omar Sultan Al Olama (عمر سلطان العلماء) is Minister of State for Artificial Intelligence in the United Arab Emirates. He was appointed in October 2017 by the Vice President and Prime Minister of the UAE and Ruler of Dubai, Sheikh Mohammed bin Rashid Al Maktoum. The UAE was the first country to hire a minister for artificial intelligence.

Early life and education 
Al Olama was born on 16 February 1990 in Dubai. He has a Bachelor Degree in Business Administration and Management from the American University in Dubai, and a Diploma in Excellence and Project Management from the American University in Sharjah.

Career 
Al Olama’s responsibilities as Minister of State for Artificial Intelligence include creating and fostering international efforts in responsibly governing Artificial Intelligence and reflecting the UAE’s vision on ethical use of AI.

Before his ministerial position, Al Olama worked in several sectors including the banking sector, telecommunications, private enterprises and government. Between February 2012 and May 2014, Al Olama was member of the corporate planning at the UAE’s Prime Minister’s Office. From November 2015 to November 2016, he was Deputy Head of Minster’s Office at the UAE’s Prime Minister’s Office. Between December 2015 and October 2017, he was Secretary General of the World Organization of Racing Drones. In November 2017, he was appointed Deputy Managing Director of the Dubai Future Foundation. Since July 2016, AlOlama has been the Managing Director of the World Government Summit.

During his work in the Future Department at the Ministry of Cabinet Affairs and the Future, AlOlama participated in developing the UAE Centennial 2071 strategy. He also participated in developing the UAE 4th Industrial Revolution Strategy that aims to promote the UAE’s status as a global hub for the 4th Industrial Revolution and develop a national economy based on knowledge, innovation and future technologies. Prior to his appointment, he worked on developing the UAE’s Artificial Intelligence Strategy.

Memberships 
In November 2017, Al Olama was appointed as a member of the ‘Shaping the Future of Digital Economy and Society’ Council (working group), part of the World Economic Forum (WEF) – Davos.

UAE Strategy for Artificial Intelligence 
In October 2017, the UAE Government launched the ‘UAE Artificial Intelligence Strategy’. It covers education, transportation, energy, space and technology.

First AI Summer Camp 
On 1 July 2018, Al Olama inaugurated the first UAE AI Summer Camp. 2,200 applications from university students and government executives were received in just 24 hours.

References

Government ministers of the United Arab Emirates
Artificial intelligence
1990 births
Living people